Tudor Owen ("Ted") Jones (died January 9, 2000) was a hydroplane designer and builder.

Biography
According to Tex Johnston, "Seattleite Ted Jones, a keen marine engineer, designed a revolutionary speedboat, the hydroplane, supported at high speed by two sponsons - streamlined, buoyant, lateral extensions - attached to the forward sides of the boat's wide, flat body. The hydroplane was powered by an Allison aircraft engine identical to the one I modified for Cobra II."

One of his boats, the Slo-Mo-Shun IV, won the 1950 Gold Cup, and set a water speed record (160.323 mph) in Lake Washington, off Seattle (USA)'s Sand Point, on June 26, 1950, breaking the previous (10+ year-old) record (141.740 mph) by almost 20 mph. He also designed several other unlimited hydroplanes that won the APBA Challenge Cup.

Legacy
His son, Ron Jones, Sr., and grandson Ron Jones, Jr. both also had distinguished careers with unlimited hydroplane racing.

Award
He was inducted in the Motorsports Hall of Fame of America in 2003.

References

2000 deaths
American motorboat racers
Hydroplanes
H1 Unlimited
Racing motorboats
APBA Challenge Cup
Year of birth missing